Francena Lynette McCorory (born October 20, 1988) is a retired American track and field athlete, known primarily for running the 400 meters. She was the 2011 World bronze medalist in the 400 meters and was a member of the gold medal-winning 2012 and 2016 United States Olympic 4 x 400 m relay teams. She was the IAAF 400 meter Indoor World Champion in 2014. McCorory retired in 2021.

Career
McCorory attended Bethel High School in her hometown of Hampton, Virginia where she displayed her talent for the 400 metres.  A notable performance was at the 2005 Virginia Group AAA Eastern Region meet, where McCorory took her team's baton as much as 80 metres behind the leaders of the race, but cruised to victory past six other teams.  Later, she set the National High School Indoor record at 51.93, a record previously held by future champion World Champion Sanya Richards, in her only attempt at the distance.

Despite being recruited by larger universities, McCorory attended her hometown school of Hampton University.  She won the 2009 NCAA Women's Indoor Track and Field Championships and later in the year finished third in the NCAA Women's Outdoor Track and Field Championships.  In 2010, she went to Fayetteville, Arkansas to defend her championship.  Instead of merely repeating as champion, she won the race by over a second, setting the NCAA record and beating Diane Dixon's 19-year-old American record in the event, running 50.54.  Later that year she won the NCAA Outdoor championship, in 50.69, actually slower than her Indoor record.  A few weeks later, she improved her personal best to 50.52 while finishing second at the USA Outdoor Track and Field Championships.

After graduating Hampton, she improved her best to 50.49 again in second at the USA Outdoor Track and Field Championships, which qualified her for the 2011 World Championships in Athletics.  A month after that, she took her best down to 50.29 at the Herculis meet in Monaco.  She took it down one more time to 50.24 in the semi-finals of the 2011 World Championships in Athletics.  In the finals, she wasn't quite as fast, finishing in fourth place in her first experience on the world stage.  A few days later she anchored the United States team to a gold medal in the 4 × 400 m relay.  In 2016, individual 3rd place Anastasia Kapachinskaya's 2008 Olympic samples were retested and found to have stanozol and turinabol.  Being her second offense she was banned for life, disqualifying her position ahead of McCorory.  In 2017, McCorory was advanced to the bronze medal.

Leading into the Olympic Trials, she improved her personal best to 50.06 at the Adidas Grand Prix.  At the Olympic Trials, she qualified for the final and was assigned lane 7, just outside Sanya Richards-Ross in lane 6.  Richards-Ross ran hard from the start closing down the stagger on McCorory.  Sensing the challenge, McCorory exploded down the backstretch, leading around the turn to the head of the home stretch, but she paid the price for the early effort and struggled to the finish.  Richards-Ross charged past her, in the process setting the best time of the year, followed by Dee Dee Trotter, who made her third straight Olympic team.  McCorory managed to hold off Debbie Dunn to claim third place and a trip to the Olympics.

At the 2012 Summer Olympics, McCorory competed in the 400m and 4 × 400 m relay. In the 400m final, McCorory finished 7th with a time of 50.33. On the relay, McCorory ran the 3rd leg of the women's 4 × 400 m (in a leg time of 49.39), with DeeDee Trotter, Allyson Felix, and Sanya Richards-Ross, with the winning time being 3:16.87, the 3rd fastest time in Olympic history behind the Soviet Union and United States at the 1988 Summer Olympics, and the 5th fastest time overall. In 2012 Penn Relays, Francena McCorory won the 4x400 with Allyson Felix, Natasha Hastings, and Sanya Richards Ross.

At the 2013 USA Outdoor Track and Field Championships she improved her personal record to 50.01.  In finishing second, she qualified for the 2013 World Championships where she improved her personal best under 50 to 49.86 in the semi-final round and got 2nd place in the 4x400 after failing to pass the Russian, but they were upgraded to gold because the Russians cheated. In the 2013 Penn Relays, Francena McCorory held off Great Britain's Perri Shakes Drayton to get gold for the USA.

At the 2014 World Indoor Championships, she was a double gold medal winner taking the 400 metres and the 4x400 relay titles.   Later in the season at the 2014 USA Outdoor Track and Field Championships another improvement of her personal record to 49.48, defeating Sanya Richards to take the win. Later that year McCorory added to her titles by being named HBCU Top 30 Under 30, in June 2014. McCorory finished 4th at 2015 USA Outdoor Track and Field Championships in 50.88.

Major competition record

References

External links

 
 
 
 
 
 

1988 births
Living people
American female sprinters
Sportspeople from Hampton, Virginia
Track and field athletes from Virginia
Hampton University alumni
Athletes (track and field) at the 2012 Summer Olympics
Athletes (track and field) at the 2016 Summer Olympics
Olympic gold medalists for the United States in track and field
World Athletics Championships medalists
Medalists at the 2012 Summer Olympics
Delta Sigma Theta members
World Athletics Championships athletes for the United States
Medalists at the 2016 Summer Olympics
Diamond League winners
USA Outdoor Track and Field Championships winners
USA Indoor Track and Field Championships winners
World Athletics Indoor Championships winners
IAAF Continental Cup winners
World Athletics Championships winners
Olympic female sprinters
21st-century American women